Football is an event at the 2013 Canada Summer Games.  There was a women's and men's competition.

Women's

Group A

Group B

Group C

Group D

Playoffs

Selected rosters

Alberta

British Columbia

Manitoba

Ranking games

Goal leaders 

Women's
Can